Kerick Col is a col running north–south at  between Gin Cove and Rum Cove, in the western part of James Ross Island, Antarctica. Crisscross Crags rise at the east side of the col. In association with names in this area from Kipling's The Jungle Book, it was named by the UK Antarctic Place-Names Committee in 1983 after Kerick Booterin, chief of the seal hunters in The White Seal.

References

Mountain passes of Graham Land
Landforms of James Ross Island